The 1990–91 Divizia A was the seventy-third season of Divizia A, the top-level football league of Romania.

Teams

League table

Positions by round

Results

Top goalscorers

Champion squad

See also 
1990–91 Divizia B

References

Liga I seasons
Romania
1990–91 in Romanian football